Records of the Australian A-League clubs in the AFC Champions League. The Western Sydney Wanderers are the only Australian side to win the competition, while Adelaide United are the only other Australian side to have made the final. Melbourne Victory have the most tournament appearances in the AFC Champions League of any Australian club, with 8 appearances, and the most matches played of any Australian club, with 53 matches played.

Overview

ACL allocation 

Since 2007, Australian clubs have participated in this league. For their first five competitions, the A-League was given two spots in the league- one for the champions (grand final winners) and one for the premiers (regular season winners- or the losing grand finalist if the champions and premiers were the same team). For the 2012 competition, another half a spot was added, with the highest placed team on the A-League table which has not already qualified for the AFC Champions League entering a playoff to enter the competition.

For the 2013 competition the AFC reduced the number of A-League qualification spots to 1.5. The Premiers (regular season winners) directly qualified for the Asian Champions League. The Champions (winners of grand final) entered a play off to qualify for the competition. The AFC ruled that the A-League did not meet the criteria for full participation in the tournament, including the lack of promotion and relegation within a tiered league system was a major reason, and that the A-league was not run as a separate entity to the FFA.

From the 2014 AFC Champions League until the 2016 edition, the allocation of two spots in the group stage and one qualifying play-off spot returned and in 2017, the qualifying play-off spot dropped back to a place in the preliminary round 2.

It is expected that from the 2023 season, the allocation will reduce to a single team to compete in the group stage, with two teams qualifying to the second-tier 2023 AFC Cup group stage.

Results

Legend
 Q : Qualified
 W : Withdrew
 PR2 : Preliminary round 2
 PO : Qualifying play-off round
 GS : Group stage
 R16 : Round of 16
 QF : Quarter-finals
 SF : Semi-finals
 RU : Runners-Up
 C : Champions

Finals

Statistics by club

Statistics by season

Games by club

Adelaide United

Brisbane Roar

Central Coast Mariners

Melbourne City

Melbourne Victory

Newcastle Jets

Perth Glory

Sydney FC

Western Sydney Wanderers

Statistics by opponents league

Chinese Super League

Liga Indonesia

J-League

Philippines Football League

Saudi Premier League

K League

Thai Premier League

Uzbek League

V.League

Records
Best Finish: Western Sydney Wanderers 2014, Champions
Worst Finish: PR2 – Brisbane Roar 2018
Biggest Crowd: 26,857 Melbourne Victory vs Gamba Osaka; 29 April 2008
Best Result: Brisbane Roar 2017, 6–0 vs Global
Worst Result: Newcastle Jets 2009, 0–6 vs Pohang Steelers, Brisbane Roar 2017, 0–6 vs Ulsan Hyundai
Most Appearances: 8 – Melbourne Victory (2008, 2010, 2011, 2014, 2016, 2018, 2019, 2020)

Top scorers

 (not including qualifying rounds).
Club lists clubs for which Champions League goals were scored.

See also 
 Individual Australian clubs in Asian football
 Central Coast Mariners FC in Asian football
 Western Sydney Wanderers FC in Asian football
 Chinese clubs in the AFC Champions League
 Indian football clubs in Asian competitions
 Indonesian football clubs in Asian competitions
 Iranian clubs in the AFC Champions League
 Iraqi clubs in the AFC Champions League
 Japanese clubs in the AFC Champions League
 Myanmar clubs in the AFC Champions League
 Qatari clubs in the AFC Champions League
 Saudi Arabian clubs in the AFC Champions League
 South Korean clubs in the AFC Champions League
 Thai clubs in the AFC Champions League
 Vietnamese clubs in the AFC Champions League

References

External links
 AFC Champions League – official website (archived)
 AFC Champions League on RSSSF

Australian soccer clubs in international competitions
Football clubs in the AFC Champions League